Fay L. Alexander (October 19, 1924 - July 16, 2000)  was a stunt man and circus acrobat.  He was one of the first trapeze artists to perform a triple somersault (a trick noteworthy for fatal attempts).  Alexander performed it routinely.  In Hollywood, he performed stunts for Tony Curtis and Doris Day and was in several movies about circus life.

References

External links

1924 births
2000 deaths
American circus performers
Trapeze artists